Huaihai Road or Huaihai Lu (Shanghainese: Wahae Lu) is a road in Shanghai, China. The central section of Huaihai Road is one of the two major shopping streets in central Shanghai; the other is Nanjing Road.  Compared with the more touristy Nanjing Road, Huaihai Road is more upscale, and is the preferred destination of local residents.  Huaihai Road comprises three sections, the main section being Middle Huaihai Road in the former French Concession of Shanghai. Middle Huaihai Road is also well known by its former French name Avenue Joffre (Shanghainese: Iafi Lu). Huaihai Road East was in the original French Concession and was formerly known as Rue Ningpo (寧波路), while Huaihai Road West was an extra-settlement road built by the Shanghai International Settlement and formerly known as Jordan Road (喬敦路)

Location
Today's Huaihai Road comprises three sections, which were formerly three distinct streets. Most of this section lies in the former Luwan District (which was also merged into Huangpu in 2010), and extends west into Xuhui and Changning districts.

History

Middle Huaihai Road
Middle Huaihai Road was built in 1901 as Rue Sikiang, after the Xi River. The eastern portion of the road east of Chungking Road (now Chongqing Road) was built first in the expanded French Concession, while the western portion was an extra-settlement road built as an extension to the initial Rue Sikiang. Five years later it was renamed Route Paul Brunat. In 1914 a further expansion of the French Concession took in the remainder of the road. It was renamed again in 1915 to Avenue Joffre to honor the French general Joseph Joffre, who visited Shanghai and attended an official renaming ceremony in 1922. The eastern portion of the road had a large concentration of shikumen residences, while the western portion was, by the 1920s, mostly lined with large houses and modern mansion blocks. In the 1920s Avenue Joffre became an enclave of a large community of Russians fleeing the Communist revolution in their homeland, which led to the middle section of the street becoming a commercial centre, lined with European-style shops, cafes and restaurants.

The Japanese occupied Shanghai during World War II, taking over the foreign concessions in 1941.  In 1943 Avenue Joffre was renamed Taishan Road after Mount Taishan.  The name only lasted two years, and after Japan was defeated the Kuomintang government renamed the street Lingsen Road in honor of Lin Sen (Ling Sen), the former President of the Republic of China who had died in 1943.  However, the Communists in turn defeated the Kuomintang in the Chinese Civil War, and took over Shanghai in 1949.  A year later the Communist government gave the street the current name, to commemorate its victorious Huaihai Campaign.

East Huaihai Road
The relatively short East Huaihai Road was built between 1874 and 1898 as Rue Ningpo. The road ran immediately north of the moat to the north of the city wall of the Shanghai old city. The road name comes from the fact that the road runs through land that was previously the property of the Siming Gongsuo, the fraternal association of residents with family origin in Ningbo, who established premises and a graveyard at this location in 1797. This area was granted to the French as part of the original French Concession in 1862, and the French authorities' attempt to resume land and relocate graves to build the road led to violent confrontations in 1874 and 1898. As part of the terms settling the dispute, the road was named after the association's home city. Rue Ningpo was renamed "East Huaihai Road" in 1950, thus avoiding the duplication of name with "Ningpo Road" in the former International Settlement.

West Huaihai Road
West Huahai Road was built as Jordan Road, an extra-settlement road, by the Shanghai Municipal Council (the governing authority of the Shanghai International Settlement). The road was mostly lined with high-end apartment buildings and large houses owned by Chinese and foreign elites. In the 1930s it was renamed Rockhill Avenue, then West Huaihai Road in 1950.

Shopping

Major buildings include IAPM Mall, Lippo Plaza, Shui On Plaza, Central Plaza, Shanghai Square, Shanghai Times Square, Hong Kong Plaza, and K11, most hosting shopping malls or department stores on the lower floors with offices on top.

The eastern section of Middle Huaihai Road near the popular Xintiandi precinct has recently seen an influx of a large number of Western luxury brands, including Louis Vuitton, Rolex, Coach, Inc., Salvatore Ferragamo S.p.A., Balenciaga, Dior, Burberry, Moschino, Valentino SpA, Versace, Dolce & Gabbana, Miu Miu, Marks & Spencer, UGG, Tiffany & Co., Cartier, Gucci, Prada, Victoria's Secret, Hermès, Vivienne Westwood, Giorgio Armani SpA, Chanel and Ermenegildo Zegna.  Many of the stores were opened in 2010 to coincide with the Shanghai Expo.

Transportation
A section of Line 1 of the Shanghai Metro runs underneath Middle Huaihai Road with three stations: Changshu Road (interchange with Line 7), South Shaanxi Road (interchange with Lines 10 and 12), and South Huangpi Road, all named after streets that intersect with Huaihai Road.   The area is also served by Middle Huaihai Road Station on Line 13 while the western parts of the road are served by Shanghai Library Station (Line 10), Jiaotong University Station (Line 10 and 11) and Hongqiao Road Station (Line 3, 4 and 10). East Huaihai Road is served by the Dashijie Station on Metro Line 8.

See also
Wukang Mansion
Wukang Road
Xintiandi

References

External links
Huaihai Road (Chinese)
Map of Middle Huaihai Road

Culture in Shanghai
Landmarks in Shanghai
Shopping districts and streets in China
Streets in Shanghai
Tourist attractions in Shanghai
Huangpu District, Shanghai
Xuhui District